High Risk (released in the United States as Meltdown and in the Philippines as Super Bodyguard) is a 1995 Hong Kong action comedy film written, produced and directed by Wong Jing and starring Jet Li, Jacky Cheung, Chingmy Yau, Charlie Yeung and Yang Chung-hsien. Corey Yuen serves as the film's fight choreographer.

The film is a parody of some of Hollywood's most influential action films, such as Die Hard and Speed.

Plot
Kit Li, a cop on the Hong Kong Police bomb squad, responds to a call at a local school, where a terrorist group led by an individual calling himself "The Doctor" has taken a school bus hostage. He soon discovers his wife and son are on board the explosives-rigged bus. The bus eventually explodes, killing everyone on the bus.

Two years later in Hong Kong, Kit leaves the force and serves as a stunt double for martial arts action star Frankie Lone. However, Helen, a tabloid reporter, films one of his stunts and thus discovers Lone's duplicity, using it to boost her show's ratings.

Frankie's father and his manager invite Kit to a jewelry exhibition at a newly opened Hotel, but the Doctor also targets the exhibition. At a traffic stop, Kit overhears the Doctor uttering a catchphrase that he used during the school bus bombing, and realizing the Doctor's identity, he follows the car back to the Hotel.

The Doctor and his team take over the building and initiate a massacre. Kit and Chow return, only to find themselves ambushed by the Doctor's gang members in a shootout, during which Chow is injured. Frankie manages to escape and runs into Fai.

Kit and Chow thin out the Doctor's numbers after driving the car out of the freight elevator. Frankie's father wrestles a weapon away from a terrorist and threatens the hacker trying to deactivate the exhibit's security measures. Chow is reunited with his girlfriend Joyce. Kit tries to kill the Doctor in revenge when the villain mocks him, but the attempt tips the scales back in the terrorists' favor. Kit, Helen and Frankie's father barely manage to escape.

Helen runs into a room with an exhibit of poisonous reptiles, places the videotape underneath a display case and hides in the men's washroom. The Doctor's younger brother, Rabbit, throws some of the snakes into the bathroom, poisoning her in the process. Kit and the Lones rescue Helen, administering anti-venom serum, and Kit learns that Helen managed to record the Doctor's face in her footage.

Meanwhile, the Doctor warns the police that if they do not meet his impossible demands, he will toss a hostage out the window every ten minutes, with Frankie's manager Charlie Tso as the first victim. Kit retrieves the tape, and successfully kills Rabbit before escaping a grenade blast and landing in police custody. The police refuse to let Kit go back into the hotel, so Kit forces the desk sergeant he encountered earlier to let him return via helicopter at gunpoint. The Lones meet Fai and Kong in the midst of an argument that has escalated into a fight. The Lones intervene, unaware of Fai's true colors, until she holds them at gunpoint. Fai is about to murder Chow, but Chow seizes her gun and shoots her dead. Kong attacks Frankie's entourage; but when he begins punching Frankie's father, Frankie retaliates and kills Kong.

The Doctor intercepts a police transmission and sends his men to ambush the helicopter. Helen manages to warn Kit, who rams the helicopter into the building. In the resulting chaos everyone escapes, but the Doctor captures Helen and takes her to the roof. Kit finds Helen with a bomb strapped to her, and the Doctor taunts him to choose between taking revenge on him or saving the life of another loved one. Kit throws a knife, hitting the Doctor in the shoulder before the latter escapes. Kit finds out that the wiring is the same as the last bomb, and this time successfully defuses it. During the defusal, he gets a call from the Doctor. Kit informs the Doctor that the dagger he threw was coated with snake venom from Helen's wound. The Doctor dies in agony and his body is looted by a trio of passing teenagers.

Frankie decides to use the incident as the basis for his new movie, while crediting everyone for their heroics. Kit, however, leaves with Helen, who expresses her gratitude with an announcement of wishing to marry him.

Cast
Jet Li as Kit Li - Kit used to work for the police, but left the force after losing his wife and son in a bomb threat he thought he had defused. He later became the personal body guard of Frankie and would even perform stunts for him when Frankie was inebriated. He is an expert martial artist and fights most of the major villains throughout most of the film.
Jacky Cheung as Frankie Lone, a famous and popular action movie star famous for doing all of his own stunts. In reality, he is very lazy and lecherous. His character is assumed to be a spoof of Jackie Chan and Bruce Lee; he even wears Lee's iconic yellow jump suit from Game of Death.
Chingmy Yau as Helen Vu
Charlie Yeung as Joyce, one of the women working at the Hotel Grandeur. She is the reluctant girlfriend of rookie detective Chow Kam.
Yang Chung-hsien as Det. Chow Kam, a rookie policeman
Kelvin Wong as The Doctor
Valerie Chow as Fai-fai, the Doctor's partner 
Billy Chow as Kong, one of the Doctor's henchmen. He is obsessed with Frankie Lone, even to the point of fantasizing about defeating him in a fight.
Ben Lam as Rabbit 
Charlie Cho as Charlie Tso - Frankie Lone's manager. Killed by the Doctor when he is thrown off the balcony of the Hotel Grandeur.
Suki Kwan as Li's Wife
Wu Ma as Frankie Lone's father

Release
High Risk was released in Hong Kong on 13 July 1995.

Reception
The film grossed a modest HK $11,403,790 in Hong Kong, where it was released as 鼠胆龍威 (High Risk, Rat's bravery and Dragon's might), which parodies the title of Die Hard (虎膽龍威 Tiger's bravery and Dragon's might) in Hong Kong.

See also
Jet Li filmography
Jacky Cheung filmography
List of Hong Kong films

References

External links

Love HK Film review

1995 films
1995 martial arts films
1995 action comedy films
1990s Cantonese-language films
Films about actors
Films about stunt performers
Films directed by Wong Jing
Films set in Hong Kong
Films shot in Hong Kong
Gun fu films
Hong Kong action comedy films
Hong Kong martial arts comedy films
Hong Kong martial arts films
Hong Kong slapstick comedy films
1990s Hong Kong films